The Défi Vert de Québec (DVQ), literally " Québec's Green Challenge", is a municipal political party in Quebec City, Quebec, Canada.

The Défi Vert de Québec is the first Canadian municipal party to adhere to this charter, which was created in Canberra in 2001. Its founder and leader was Richard Domm.

Press review
 June 14, 2009 "Fourbir les armes" on Radio-Canada. A report on the next municipal elections in Québec .
 June 14, 2009 TV report: The municipal revival in Québec, with the Défi Vert holding their congress this weekend, a report by Catherine Lanthier.
 March 17, 2009 "Défi vert de Québec: ecology via everything else" in Québec Hebdo.
 May 29, 2007 "A new party in Québec" on Radio-Canada.
 October 5, 2007 "The DVQ would account for GHGs Québec arena standards." in Québec Hebdo.

External links

  Défi Vert de Québec official website for the municipal party.
  Défi Vert de Québec on Twitter (microblogging system)
  Global Greens Charter - Canberra 2001 - Defining what it means to be Green in the new millennium: The Global Greens is the international network of Green parties and political movements.

Municipal political parties in Quebec City